Chivasso railway station serves the town and comune of Chivasso, in the Piedmont region, northwestern Italy.  Opened in 1856, it forms part of the Turin–Milan railway, and is also a junction for three other lines, to Aosta, Asti and Alessandria, respectively.

The station is currently managed by Rete Ferroviaria Italiana (RFI).  Train services are operated by Trenitalia.  Each of these companies is a subsidiary of Ferrovie dello Stato Italiane (FS), Italy's state-owned rail company.

Location
Chivasso railway station is situated at Piazza Giuseppe Garibaldi, at the northern edge of the town centre.

History
The station was opened on 20 October 1856, together with the rest of the Turin–Novara section of the Turin–Milan railway.  Two years later, upon the inauguration of the Chivasso–Aosta railway, the station became a junction station.

In 1887, the line to Casale Monferrato came into operation, and in 1912, the line to Asti was activated.

The station was heavily damaged by Allied bombing during World War II.

Features
The station yard now features six tracks plus a bay platform that serves as the terminus of the line to Asti.

The goods yard, on the south side of the line and west of the station, was taken out of service in the second half of the 1990s and upgraded with the construction of a new bus terminal and the new public library.

Train services
The station is served by the following services:

Express services (Regionale Veloce) Turin - Chivasso – Santhià – Vercelli – Novara – Milan
Express services (Regionale Veloce) Turin - Chivasso – Ivrea – Aosta
Regional services (Treno regionale) Ivrea - Chivasso
Regional services (Treno regionale) Chivasso - Santhià - Vercelli - Novara
Regional services (Treno regionale) Chivasso - Casale Monferrato - Alessandria
Regional services (Treno regionale) Turin - Chivasso - Santhià - Biella
Turin Metropolitan services (SFM2) Pinerolo - Turin - Chivasso

Trams and buses
The station has a bus terminal.

See also

History of railways in Italy
List of railway stations in Piedmont
Rail transport in Italy
Railway stations in Italy

References

External links

This article is based upon a translation of the Italian language version as at February 2011.

Railway stations in the Metropolitan City of Turin
Railway stations opened in 1856
Chivasso